Rose-Marie Avramescu  (born 7 February 1956) is a singer, television personality, and radio presenter from Northern Ireland. The daughter of Ann and Owen, she is one of six siblings raised on a farm outside Newry, County Down.

Local and international success
While Rose-Marie enjoyed success as a local and national television personality in the United Kingdom, she has also released nineteen albums.

At the International Music Awards, Rose-Marie was voted 'Most Popular Singer', and has sold out at the London Palladium on more than one occasion.

Rose-Marie is a former judge in two series of the BBC talent show Go For It. Other television appearances include The Royal Variety Show, Shooting Stars, Doctors, Big Brother's Little Brother, a documentary of herself and various chat shows. As well as her work on television she has been involved in acting in several stage productions and on radio, and played Rita in the 2001 film, Cold Fish.

Rose-Marie is also involved in charity work, including the promotion of road safety and charity for the underprivileged. Her legs are insured by Lloyd's of London.

Selected discography

UK singles

When I Leave The World Behind (1983) - UK #63
Let The Rest Of The World Go By (1984) - UK #76
All The Love (In The World) (1985) - UK #91

UK albums

Rose Marie Sings Just For You (1985) - UK #30
So Lucky (1986) - UK #62
Sentimentally Yours (1987) - UK #22
Together Again (1988) - UK #52
Memories Of Home (1996) - UK #51

References

External links
Official website

Living people
Women singers from Northern Ireland
People from Newry
1956 births
Musicians from County Down